
Lake Bonney SE (alternative name: Coonunda or Canunda) is a coastal freshwater lake located in the Limestone Coast region of South Australia in the gazetted locality of Canunda.

The Canunda National Park lies adjacent to the lake shore.

Naming
The lake was named Lake Bonney in 1844 by George Grey, the then Governor of South Australia.

The name was proposed in 1916 to be changed by the Nomenclature Committee to "Coonunda Lake" but was not actioned without any reason provided. "Coonunda" or "Canunda" is the Aboriginal name for the lake.

In both 1972 and 1981, the District Council of Barmera wrote to the South Australian Government requesting that the lake be renamed with its native name, i.e. "Canunda" or "Coonunda", in order to avoid being confused with the lake in the Riverland, South Australia|Riverland of South Australia]]. In response to the request sent in 1981, the Geographical Names Board renamed both lakes as "Lake Bonney, Riverland" and "Lake Bonney SE" in order to differentiate between the lakes. A further request for a name change sent in 1989 by the District Council of Barmera was not approved by the Geographical Names Board.

See also

 List of lakes of South Australia
 Lake Bonney Wind Farm

References 

  

Bonney (Limestone Coast)
Limestone Coast